Kupinovac   is a village in Croatia. It is connected by the D43 highway.

References 

Populated places in Bjelovar-Bilogora County